German submarine U-139 was a Type IID U-boat of Nazi Germany's Kriegsmarine during World War II. Her keel was laid down on 20 November 1939 by Deutsche Werke in Kiel as yard number 268. She was launched on 28 June 1940 and commissioned on 24 July 1940 with Kapitänleutnant Robert Bartels in command.

U-139 began her service life with the 1st U-boat Flotilla. She was then assigned to the 21st flotilla and subsequently to the 22nd flotilla where she conducted two patrols, but did not sink or damage any ships. She spent the rest of the war as a training vessel.

She was scuttled on 5 May 1945.

Design
German Type IID submarines were enlarged versions of the original Type IIs. U-139 had a displacement of  when at the surface and  while submerged. She had two shafts and two  propellers.

U-139 was fitted with three  torpedo tubes at the bow, five torpedoes or up to twelve Type A torpedo mines, and a  anti-aircraft gun. The boat had a complement of 25.

Operational career
She made short voyages from Oxhöft (a suburb of Gdynia in modern-day Poland), to Windau (Ventspils in Latvia) and Stormelö between 16 July and 18 August 1941.

First patrol
The boat's first official patrol commenced with her departure from Windau on 29 July 1941. She arrived in Stormelö without incident on 18 August.

Second patrol
Her second patrol was also abortive, departing Stormelö on 28 August 1941 and arriving in Gotenhafen (Gdynia) on 31 August.

Loss
U-139 was scuttled in the Raederschleuse (lock) in Wilhelmshaven on 5 May 1945. The wreck was broken up on an unknown date.

References

Bibliography

External links
 

German Type II submarines
U-boats commissioned in 1940
World War II submarines of Germany
1940 ships
Ships built in Kiel
Operation Regenbogen (U-boat)
Maritime incidents in May 1945